Southbank tram depot is located in Southbank, a suburb of Melbourne, Australia. Operated by Yarra Trams, it is one of eight tram depots on the Melbourne tram network.

History
Southbank tram depot opened on 8 February 1997 on the site of the former Montague shipping shed replacing South Melbourne depot. When the Public Transport Corporation was privatised in August 1999, Southbank depot passed to Yarra Trams. The depot was extended in 2009 as part of the E-class tram project.

Layout
The main yard has nine roads, two of these inside a maintenance shed. There are also two stabling roads for the three Colonial Tramcar Restaurant cars, which also operate from this depot. Two entrances exist, East Gate and West Gate.

Rolling stock
As at December 2019, the depot had an allocation of 65 trams: 23 A1 Class, 3 A2 Class, 5 C2 Class, 7 E Class, 16 E2 Class, 3 SW6 Class and 8 W8 Class. Servicing of Z3-class trams from other depots is performed at Southbank, however these trams are not used on Southbank routes.

Routes
The following routes are operated from Southbank depot:
: Victoria Gardens to St Kilda
: St Vincent's Plaza to Central Pier Docklands
: City Circle
: Coburg West to Toorak shared with Essendon depot
: Brunswick East to St Kilda Beach

References

Tram depots in Melbourne
Transport infrastructure completed in 1997
1997 establishments in Australia
Buildings and structures in the City of Melbourne (LGA)
Southbank, Victoria
Transport in the City of Melbourne (LGA)